Bobby Harris (born June 15, 1983) is a former professional American and Canadian football offensive lineman who last played for the Florida Tuskers of the United Football League. He was signed by the San Francisco 49ers as an undrafted free agent in 2006. He played college football for the Ole Miss Rebels.

Harris was also a member of the Frankfurt Galaxy, Carolina Panthers, Orlando Predators and Saskatchewan Roughriders.

References

1983 births
Living people
American football offensive linemen
American players of Canadian football
Canadian football offensive linemen
Carolina Panthers players
Frankfurt Galaxy players
Florida Tuskers players
Ole Miss Rebels football players
Orlando Predators players
San Francisco 49ers players
Saskatchewan Roughriders players
Sportspeople from Richmond, Virginia
Players of American football from Richmond, Virginia
Players of Canadian football from Virginia